Yidnekachew Shimangus (born 12 February 1978) is an Eritrean former professional footballer who played as a striker. With five goals in 22 appearances, Shimangus is his country's joint all-time top goalscorer and most capped player.

International career
Shimangus was a regular for the Eritrea national team virtually since its inception, and featured in the 2008 Africa Cup of Nations qualification matches, arguably their most successful campaign to date.

He played in two World Cup qualifying matches.

Career statistics

See also
 List of top international men's football goalscorers by country

References

1978 births
Living people
Eritrean footballers
Eritrea international footballers
Association football forwards
Adulis Club players
Eritrean Premier League players